Lustre is a formally defined, declarative, and synchronous dataflow programming language for programming reactive systems. It began as a research project in the early 1980s. A formal presentation of the language can be found in the 1991 Proceedings of the IEEE. In 1993 it progressed to practical, industrial use in a commercial product as the core language of the industrial environment SCADE, developed by Esterel Technologies. It is now used for critical control software in aircraft, helicopters, and nuclear power plants.

Structure of Lustre programs

A Lustre program is a series of node definitions, written as:
 node foo(a : bool) returns (b : bool);
 let
   b = not a;
 tel

Where foo is the name of the node, a is the name of the single input of this node and b is the name of the single output.
In this example the node foo returns the negation of its input a, which is the expected result.

Inner variables
Additional internal variables can be declared as follows: 
  node Nand(X,Y: bool) returns (Z: bool);
    var U: bool;
  let
    U = X and Y;
    Z = not U;
  tel
Note: The equations order doesn't matter, the order of lines U = X and Y; and Z = not U; doesn't change the result.

Special operators

Examples

Edge detection
 node Edge (X : bool) returns (E : bool);
 let
   E = false -> X and not pre X;
 tel

See also
Esterel
SIGNAL (another dataflow-oriented synchronous language)
Synchronous programming language
Dataflow programming

References

External links
Synchrone Lab  Official website 
SCADE product page

Declarative programming languages
Synchronous programming languages
Hardware description languages
Formal methods
Software modeling language